A general education liceum (Polish: Liceum ogólnokształcące ) is an academic high school in the Polish educational system. They are attended by those who plan to further their academic education upon graduation from szkoła podstawowa (compulsory education) through a path other than Technikum or Vocational school (since it's impossible for one to be at the age of 18 or more upon graduation from szkola podstawowa, thus education is still mandatory for them one has to pick one of the three).

Before graduating from liceum, students take a final exam called a "matura" (equivalent to the A-Level). It's a tradition for students of graduating grades and school staff to host and attend a prom called "studniówka" about a 100 days before the exams.

There are several types (ages of students in brackets):
 General Liceum (15-19)
 Specialized Liceum (15-19)
 Supplementary Liceum (17-20, optional for vocational school graduates wanting to supplement their education)

References

See also
Education in Poland
Technikum (Polish education)
The Academic High School in Toruń, the first high school in Poland especially created for outstanding students
Bartłomiej Nowodworski High School, the oldest high school in Poland
Jan III Sobieski High School in Kraków

School types
Schools in Poland